Permatang Rambai is a village in Penaga, North Seberang Perai District, state of Penang, Malaysia.

North Seberang Perai District
Villages in Penang